Nithyaharitha Nayakan is a 2018 Malayalam comedy film, produced by Dharmajan Bolgatty. The movie stars Vishnu Unnikrishnan, Manju Pillai, Indrans, Bijukuttan. Ranjin Raj scored the film. Pavi K Pavan was the cinematographer. This film was released on 16 November 2018.

The film received positive reviews and Critics Rating of 2.5/5 as reported by Times of India.

Plot
Sajimon has many desires, but things go wrong for him. The film follows his romantic relationships. Sajimon tells stories of his relationships to his wife Haritha on his wedding night. Sajimon describes his romance with Nithya. His classmate Joby helps Sajimon to win her love. During his college days, Sajimon falls in love with Surumi. Vasu and Omana, who are the parents of Sajimon, provide comedy scenes.

Cast

Music
The film music were composed by Ranjin Raj.<ref
name="indiatimes.com-Song"></ref>

References

External links
 

2018 films
2010s Malayalam-language films
Indian comedy films
2018 comedy films